Ivankovo is the name of several rural localities in Russia.

Chelyabinsk Oblast
As of 2010, one rural locality in Chelyabinsk Oblast bears this name:
Ivankovo, Chelyabinsk Oblast, a settlement in Drobyshevsky Selsoviet of Troitsky District

Ivanovo Oblast
As of 2010, two rural localities in Ivanovo Oblast bear this name:
Ivankovo, Furmanovsky District, Ivanovo Oblast, a village in Furmanovsky District
Ivankovo, Ivanovsky District, Ivanovo Oblast, a village in Ivanovsky District

Kaluga Oblast
As of 2010, two rural localities in Kaluga Oblast bear this name:
Ivankovo, Meshchovsky District, Kaluga Oblast, a village in Meshchovsky District
Ivankovo, Zhizdrinsky District, Kaluga Oblast, a village in Zhizdrinsky District

Kirov Oblast
As of 2010, one rural locality in Kirov Oblast bears this name:
Ivankovo, Kirov Oblast, a village in Vikharevsky Rural Okrug of Kilmezsky District

Kostroma Oblast
As of 2010, three rural localities in Kostroma Oblast bear this name:
Ivankovo, Nerekhtsky District, Kostroma Oblast, a village in Volzhskoye Settlement of Nerekhtsky District
Ivankovo, Sudislavsky District, Kostroma Oblast, a village in Sudislavskoye Settlement of Sudislavsky District
Ivankovo, Vokhomsky District, Kostroma Oblast, a village in Belkovskoye Settlement of Vokhomsky District

Kurgan Oblast
As of 2010, three rural localities in Kurgan Oblast bear this name:
Ivankovo, Almenevsky District, Kurgan Oblast, a selo in Ivankovsky Selsoviet of Almenevsky District
Ivankovo, Mishkinsky District, Kurgan Oblast, a selo in Ivankovsky Selsoviet of Mishkinsky District
Ivankovo, Tselinny District, Kurgan Oblast, a selo in Ivankovsky Selsoviet of Tselinny District

Novgorod Oblast
As of 2010, one rural locality in Novgorod Oblast bears this name:
Ivankovo, Novgorod Oblast, a village in Fedorkovskoye Settlement of Parfinsky District

Perm Krai
As of 2010, one rural locality in Perm Krai bears this name:
Ivankovo, Perm Krai, a village in Suksunsky District

Pskov Oblast
As of 2010, one rural locality in Pskov Oblast bears this name:
Ivankovo, Pskov Oblast, a village in Opochetsky District

Ryazan Oblast
As of 2010, three rural localities in Ryazan Oblast bear this name:
Ivankovo, Klepikovsky District, Ryazan Oblast, a village in Malakhovsky Rural Okrug of Klepikovsky District
Ivankovo, Spassky District, Ryazan Oblast, a selo in Ivankovsky Rural Okrug of Spassky District
Ivankovo, Yermishinsky District, Ryazan Oblast, a village in Turmadeyevsky Rural Okrug of Yermishinsky District

Smolensk Oblast
As of 2010, three rural localities in Smolensk Oblast bear this name:
Ivankovo, Kholm-Zhirkovsky District, Smolensk Oblast, a village in Agibalovskoye Rural Settlement of Kholm-Zhirkovsky District
Ivankovo, Ugransky District, Smolensk Oblast, a village in Rusanovskoye Rural Settlement of Ugransky District
Ivankovo, Vyazemsky District, Smolensk Oblast, a village in Zavodskoye Rural Settlement of Vyazemsky District

Tambov Oblast
As of 2010, one rural locality in Tambov Oblast bears this name:
Ivankovo, Tambov Oblast, a selo in Avdeyevsky Selsoviet of Tambovsky District

Tver Oblast
As of 2010, eight rural localities in Tver Oblast bear this name:
Ivankovo, Bezhetsky District, Tver Oblast, a village in Bezhetsky District
Ivankovo, Kalyazinsky District, Tver Oblast, a village in Kalyazinsky District
Ivankovo, Kuvshinovsky District, Tver Oblast, a village in Kuvshinovsky District
Ivankovo, Selizharovsky District, Tver Oblast, a village in Selizharovsky District
Ivankovo, Staritsky District, Tver Oblast, a village in Staritsky District
Ivankovo, Torzhoksky District, Tver Oblast, a village in Torzhoksky District
Ivankovo (Kholokholenskoye Rural Settlement), Vyshnevolotsky District, Tver Oblast, a village in Vyshnevolotsky District; municipally, a part of Kholokholenskoye Rural Settlement of that district
Ivankovo (Kolomenskoye Rural Settlement), Vyshnevolotsky District, Tver Oblast, a village in Vyshnevolotsky District; municipally, a part of Kolomenskoye Rural Settlement of that district

Vologda Oblast
As of 2010, two rural localities in Vologda Oblast bear this name:
Ivankovo, Sheksninsky District, Vologda Oblast, a village in Nifantovsky Selsoviet of Sheksninsky District
Ivankovo, Sokolsky District, Vologda Oblast, a village in Arkhangelsky Selsoviet of Sokolsky District

Yaroslavl Oblast
As of 2010, two rural localities in Yaroslavl Oblast bear this name:
Ivankovo, Uglichsky District, Yaroslavl Oblast, a selo in Zaozersky Rural Okrug of Uglichsky District
Ivankovo, Yaroslavsky District, Yaroslavl Oblast, a village in Tochishchensky Rural Okrug of Yaroslavsky District

See also
Ivankovo (disambiguation)